Stars Are Born was an early American television series which aired in New York City during 1951. A local series, it aired on DuMont Television Network's flagship station WABD, and like most WABD series was likely considered eligible to be picked up as a network series. It ran for several months, and aired in a 30-minute time-slot. It is not known if the series had a sponsor (surviving kinescopes of DuMont and WABD series suggest that, if it had a sponsor, the running time was about 24–25 minutes excluding commercials). It debuted February 4 and ran into May. The series featured dance numbers performed by children enrolled in various dancing schools in New York City. The program is likely lost, as most "local" shows of the 1950s are lost.

Reception
Bob Lanigan for the Brooklyn Eagle newspaper said the program was "far from dull" and "had plenty of sparkle and imagination".

References

External links
Stars are Born on IMDb

1950s American children's television series
1951 American television series debuts
1951 American television series endings
American live television series
Lost American television shows
Black-and-white American television shows
Dance television shows
Local children's television programming in the United States